Woolstaston is a civil parish in Shropshire, England.  It contains eight listed buildings that are recorded in the National Heritage List for England.  Of these, three are listed at Grade II*, the middle of the three grades, and the others are at Grade II, the lowest grade.  The parish contains the village of Woolstaston and the smaller settlement of Walkmills, and is otherwise rural.  All the listed buildings are in the settlements, most of which are houses, farmhouses and farm buildings, and all of which are timber framed or have a timber framed core.  The other listed buildings are a church and the surviving wing of a former country house.


Key

Buildings

References

Citations

Sources

Lists of buildings and structures in Shropshire